Abachurina Post Office is a 1973 Indian Kannada language drama film directed by N. Lakshminarayan, based on a short story of the same name written by Poornachandra Tejaswi. It stars Naani, Girija Lokesh, Dasharathi Dikshith and Ramesh Bhat in lead roles. The film won many laurels upon release including the National Film Award for Best Feature Film in Kannada for its clear handling of the typical human mind amidst his curiosity.

The film produced by Patre C. Vinayak was certified with U grade and its musical score is by Vijaya Bhaskar.

Cast
 Naani 
 Girija Lokesh
 Dasharathi Dikshith
 S. Seetharam
 Ramesh Bhat
 B. S. Rama Rao
 M. S. Sheela
 A. L. Sreenivasan
 P. Renuka
 B. R. Jayaram

Music
The background score is composed by Vijaya Bhaskar. No soundtrack has been released for the film.

Awards
 1973 : National Film Award for Best Feature Film in Kannada 
 1973-74 : Karnataka State Film Award for Best Film

References

External links
 
 Stage play

1973 films
Indian black-and-white films
Films based on Indian novels
1970s Kannada-language films
Films scored by Vijaya Bhaskar
Best Kannada Feature Film National Film Award winners
Films directed by N. Lakshminarayan